Jason Andrew Dawe (born 4 May 1967) is an English journalist and television presenter. He presented the rebooted first series of Top Gear on BBC Two alongside Jeremy Clarkson and Richard Hammond.  In 2005, he began presenting Used Car Roadshow; the programme was cancelled two years later in 2007. He also presented the programme Classic Gear, which was supposed to be a remake of the 1978–2001 format of Top Gear.

Journalism
Brought up in Cornwall, Dawe worked at car dealerships and as a motoring industry trainer.

Dawe is a regular columnist in The Sunday Times motoring section, where he has written extensively about used cars. Together with Nick Rufford of The Sunday Times he has also made many video broadcasts of car reviews. He writes for many other motoring magazines and is a regular contributor to radio and TV shows as a motoring expert.

In addition to this, Dawe has also been occasionally known to write in the Automobile Association magazine.

Top Gear
Initially, Jeremy Clarkson wanted James May to present the rebooted series of Top Gear; however, May declined, with Dawe later agreeing to present the first series alongside Clarkson and Richard Hammond.  

When May wished to present the show for the second series due to the increasing popularity of the programme, Clarkson thought about Dawe staying and to have four presenters. However, his co-presenter Richard Hammond was close to being fired by BBC management alongside Dawe. Nevertheless show executive producer Andy Wilman strongly supported Hammond's position on the show at the time, stating later in The Guardian "There was no doubt that Richard would stay”.  

Following his departure from Top Gear, Dawe returned to his presenting career in 2005, appearing on ITV's Used Car Roadshow with Penny Mallory until the programme was cancelled in 2007.

References

External links

1967 births
English television presenters
Living people
Television personalities from Cornwall
Top Gear people
People from Camelford